Ameer Emmanuel Vann (born September 22, 1996) is an American rapper. He is best known for being a member of music collective Brockhampton, until his departure from the group in May 2018. After leaving Brockhampton, Vann started his solo career and released his first commercial EP, Emmanuel, in September 2019.

Early life 
Ameer Emmanuel Vann was born in Houston, Texas, on September 22, 1996. He attended The Woodlands High School in Texas with future Brockhampton bandmates Kevin Abstract, Joba, Matt Champion, and Merlyn Wood. He held various jobs before joining Brockhampton, including working in a slaughterhouse and as a trash collector. Vann has also revealed in several songs that he has had a pill addiction due to sleeping problems, and often sold drugs from his mother's house.

Career 
Vann embarked on his career as a member of AliveSinceForever, a group that started on the forum KanyeToThe in 2010, from which Brockhampton would eventually form. He was featured on their only project, The ASF EP, released on July 29, 2013, on the tracks "Silent Water" and "Rabbits", both with Kevin Abstract.

Vann also released an eponymous EP, titled Ameer Vann EP, on October 29, 2013. He was one of the founding members of Brockhampton in 2015, and along with Kevin Abstract, contributed to "a fair amount of the group's image and vision". Vann has been called, "the face of the Saturation trilogy", being featured on the covers of Brockhampton's 2017 albums, Saturation, Saturation II, and Saturation III.

However, the group decided to part ways with Vann on May 27, 2018, following sexual abuse allegations. After a hiatus and disappearance from social media, Vann reemerged on September 16, 2019 to announce the release of his debut commercial project Emmanuel, the following night. Vann's first solo live performance was at Sound Of Brazil (S.O.B.'s) in New York City on September 23, 2019. The setlist included tracks from Emmanuel and older tracks from 2017, as well as unreleased songs.

On October 15, 2020, Vann released the Donut-produced single "Keep Your Distance" via Winston Wolf and RCA Records. On January 14, 2021, Vann released a second single titled "IDFIATOK" (an acronym for "I Don't Fit In and That's OK").

Artistry 
Vann is best known for his laid back flow and his frequent use of themes of racism, cynicism, substance abuse and introspection.

Controversies

Sexual misconduct allegations 

In May 2018, Vann was the subject of sexual misconduct and abuse allegations, after multiple women came forward detailing their experiences; some of which included him being, "emotionally manipulative, and mentally abusive", and engaging in sexual relations with a minor. He later responded to the allegations, denying sexual misconduct or sexual relations with a minor, in a series of tweets.

As a result, Brockhampton delayed, and ultimately shelved the release of their then-upcoming fourth studio album Puppy, which was scheduled to be released the following month, as well as cancelling their remaining tour dates. On May 27, a statement was issued by the group announcing Vann's departure.

Robbery accusations 

In December 2018, former bandmate Dom McLennon posted a tweet claiming that Vann had arranged for one of his friends to be robbed, and did not reveal his involvement until after the controversy that led to his departure. McLennon later addressed this in Brockhampton's "Dearly Departed" from their 2019 album Ginger, elaborating on the robbery and further criticising Vann's behaviour. Vann denied the allegations in a freestyle he posted on his Instagram page in March 2021.

Discography

Extended plays
 Ameer Vann EP (2013)
 Emmanuel (2019)

With Brockhampton

Studio albums
 Saturation (2017)
 Saturation II (2017)
 Saturation III (2017)

Mixtapes
 All-American Trash (2016)

With AliveSinceForever

Extended plays
 The ASF EP (2013)

Singles

Guest appearances

References

1996 births
21st-century American rappers
Brockhampton (band) members
Living people
RCA Records artists